Pontibacter yuliensis  is a Gram-negative and rod-shaped bacterium from the genus of Pontibacter which has been isolated from soil from a Populus euphratica forest in the Taklamakan desert in Xinjiang in China.

References 

Cytophagia
Bacteria described in 2014